Ronald George Draper (born 24 December 1926) is a South African former cricketer who played in two Tests in 1950. He played first-class cricket from 1945 to 1959. Since 3 September 2021 he has been the oldest living Test cricketer.

Playing career
Draper was born in Oudtshoorn, Cape Province, and was educated at Grey High School in Port Elizabeth. Batting at number three, on his 19th birthday he made a century on his first-class debut for Eastern Province in December 1945, making the top score in the match. He began keeping wicket for Eastern Province in 1946–47, which he did irregularly for the rest of his career.

Draper was selected as wicket-keeper for a South African XI that played the Australian touring team in 1949–50. A few weeks later he made 86 opening the batting for Eastern Province against the Australians. After South Africa lost the first three Tests to Australia, Draper was one of five new players the selectors brought in for the Fourth Test, four of whom, including Draper, were making their Test debuts. Batting at number three, he made only 15, but the match was drawn and he kept his place for the Fifth Test, when he made 7 and 3 in an innings defeat.

He played no further Tests, but remained a batsman in the Currie Cup for some years. In his first two matches in the 1952–53 season, now opening the batting for Griqualand West, he scored 145 and 8 against Rhodesia, and 129 and 177 against Border, the first time anyone had scored a century in each innings in the Currie Cup. In each of these two matches he reached a century before lunch on the first day. They were his last first-class centuries. In his last first-class match, against Transvaal B in 1959–60, he made 39 out of Griqualand West's first-innings total of 77. His younger brother Errol played for Eastern Province in 1951–52 and for Griqualand West from 1953–54 to 1967–68.

With the death of John Watkins on 3 September 2021, Draper became the oldest living Test cricketer.

References

External links

1926 births
Living people
People from Oudtshoorn
South African people of British descent
South Africa Test cricketers
South African cricketers
Eastern Province cricketers
Griqualand West cricketers
Cricketers from the Western Cape